The Motorola ROKR, the first version of which was informally known as the iTunes phone, was a series of mobile phones from Motorola, part of a 4LTR line developed before the spin out of Motorola Mobility. ROKR models were released starting in September 2005 and ending in 2009. They were notable for incorporating support of media player features.

E1

Launched on September 7, 2005, in San Francisco, California, the E1 is the first phone to be integrated with Apple's iTunes music player, the next phone being the first iPhone in 2007. The phone had been widely expected, with technology sites reporting on collaborations between Motorola and Apple as far back as December 2004.

Description and acceptance
The ROKR E1 is a re-badged Motorola E398 candybar style phone (it was originally called the E790) with Apple-licensed technology to play back iTunes Music Store purchased music. It features a music player with an interface similar to that of Apple's iPod music players. Since hardware on Motorola E398 and ROKR E1 phones are the same, it is possible to crossflash Motorola ROKR E1's firmware to Motorola E398 using phone flashing software like flash & backup.

While the phone equipped an upgradeable 512 MB microSD memory card (Max. 1 GB), its firmware allowed only up to 100 songs to be loaded at any time.  The limit hurt the ROKR's appeal. Many users also discovered that transferring music to the phone was slow compared to dedicated players, due to lack of support for Hi-Speed USB, and the E1 lacked wireless transfer. The Rokr was also criticized for being too much like the preceding E398. As a result, the Rokr E1 sold below expectations despite a high-profile marketing campaign.

Because of the iPod Nano unveiling on the same day, relations between Motorola and Apple were strained and Motorola CEO Ed Zander later accused Apple of purposely undercutting the Rokr.

The Rokr E1 was replaced by the E2 (see below), which lacked iTunes support and was superseded by the iTunes-enabled SLVR L7.

E2

The E2 was released in January 2006. Instead of iTunes, the phone came bundled with RealPlayer, supporting a larger variety of formats. It also featured a music control panel on the left side of the phone. Users can also listen to stereo FM radio with Motorola Rokr E2. By using iRadio, FM radio programs can also be downloaded into the phone through internet, letting users listen to the radio at any time. The first public release occurred on June 22, 2006, in China.

Features
 Talk time: up to 9 hours
 Standby time: up to 8 days
 Multimedia playback: MP3, AMR, MID, MIDI, SMF, MMF, XMF, IMY, WAV, RA, WMA, AAC, AWB, MPGA, M4A, 3GA, RM, RMVB, 3GP, MP4 by RealPlayer
 Audio connector: 3.5 mm headset jack
 Java support: MIDP 2.0, CLDC 1.1, HEAP 2mb
 Browser: Opera 8.50 with e-mail support
 Local connectivity:

As a Linux-based phone, the open source community developed numerous modifications to the phone's software, such as quad band, EDGE, and support for a 4 GB SD card.  Some have overclocked the processor.

E6

The E6 was released in China on November 14, 2006, and subsequently worldwide on December 4, 2006.

The Rokr E6 is a direct descendant of the E680 and the MING, sharing the same Montavista Linux operating system, Intel XScale PXA270 series processors, and the RealPlayer media player instead of the iTunes player installed on the first Rokr phone. The E6 features a built-in FM radio, (but no radio recording). It also inherited the 2-megapixel camera with manual macro-switching and business card recognition from MING, enhanced with QR Code recognition functions. Additionally, the phone features a 3.5 mm headphone jack, allowing use of a standard-sized headphone plug.

It comes installed with Picsel Viewer with the ability to read Microsoft Office and PDF file formats.

Details
The phone is part of Motorola's line of phones running Linux, this one using a modified 2.4.20 kernel. This has upset some, as they broke the GPL in not releasing the kernel source code. The software is an updated version of MING (Motorola A1200), with a different file system. Most of the apps that work on the MING work on the E6, but some may not due to the file system. Normally the phone only runs on tri-band GSM networks, though some have found an exploit to get it to run on Quad Band networks and over Edge. The radio channel frequency can also be modified beyond 88 MHz to 65 MHz, and the preset number of channels can also be modified.

Technical specifications

Z6

The Z6, originally known as the Rizr Z6, was released on July 7, 2007. The Z6 features Motorola's new version of the embedded Linux-based operating system, MOTOMAGX. It also supports stereo Bluetooth technology (A2DP) and features a 2-megapixel digital camera. The Z6 also supports synchronisation with Windows Media Player 11, allowing playlists and audio to be transferred to the phone's internal memory, which can in turn be transferred onto a compatible microSD memory card. The phone does not support 3G or HSDPA, relying on EDGE for data.

Audio format support
The Z6 supports the following audio formats:

 Windows WMAv10 plus Janus DRM
 MP3
 AAC
 AAC+
 AAC+ enhanced
 AMR NB
 WAV
 XMF

Video format support
The Z6 supports the following video formats:

 3GP
 3G2
 MP4
 RealVideo
 xvid

Z6m

The Z6m is the CDMA version of the Rokr Z6. The Rokr Z6m comes with an integrated music player, 3.5 mm headset jack, stereo Bluetooth, a 512 MB MicroSD card in its respective slot, a key lock switch, and a 2-megapixel digital camera. The phone supports up to 2 GB of removable storage.

Unlike the Z6, the Z6m does not run MotoMAGX, a version of Linux, but instead runs the Binary Runtime Environment for Wireless operating system, also known as BREW.

U.S. Cellular was the first carrier to release the Rokr Z6m on October 14, 2007, alongside their Napster-to-Go service's launch.

Technical information
When connected to a computer via USB and the connection type is set to "Modem/COM", the phone acts like a USB serial peripheral, allowing Motorola Phone AT Commands to be sent. In this mode, sending "AT+MODE=8" will put the phone into a different state,
in which it no longer accepts AT commands but its P2K05 functionality is accessible.

W5

The W5 was released in September 2007. The phone features up to 2 GB through a microSD slot, a 1.3-megapixel camera, Motorola's P2K OS, and a music player.

E8

The E8 was released in July 2008. It features a new keypad interface called ModeShift, which automatically changes the context of the keypad depending on the current function of the device. It also features a localized touch feedback system with haptic technology that gives the feeling of real buttons, though the keyboard surface is smooth. It will sync with Microsoft Outlook, but not with Web or Mac based calendars.

Both E8 and EM30 uses the ModeShift technology and this enables the phone to switch from talk to music with one touch (special music keys light up when playing music) Coupled with in-build CrystalTalk technology (a Motorola patent), crisp and clear conversations is possible in noisy environments.

Carriers
 T-Mobile
 Rogers Wireless
 Cellular One

Specifications
The complete Motorola Rokr E8 list of specifications are:

EM30

The EM30, releasing in August 2008, was the lower-end version of the E8 (see above), without the FastScroll navigation wheel and the haptics feel.

EM30 is running on LiMo Platform, a Linux-based operating system for mobile devices. It is the 22nd LiMo Handset.

Both E8 and EM30 uses the ModeShift technology and this enables the phone to switch from talk to music with one touch (special music keys get lighted up when playing music) The phone incorporated Motorola's patented CrystalTalk technology, providing clear conversations in noisy environments.

Specifications
Messaging: MMS, EMS 5.0, email (POP3, SMTP, IMAP4), Motosync for corporate email support
Connectivity method:	Stereo Bluetooth Class 2, 3.5mm, USB 2.0 HS, Mobile Phone Tools, Over the Air Sync (OTA), PC Sync
Dual Transfer Mode (DTM):	Enables GPRS during call; operator dependent
Camera:	2 MP, Digital Zoom, Fixed Focus, take up to 8 multi shot pictures
Capture/Playback/Streaming:	H.263, MPEG4, WMV v9
Audio:	MIDI, MP3, AAC, AAC+, Enhanced AAC+, WMA, WAV, AMR-NB, Real Audio (RA) v10
FM Radio:	with Radio Data System (RDS) 3
Keypad:	Backlight morphing keypad that changes color from phone mode to music mode
Airplane Mode:	Uninterrupted music up in the plane/play music
3.5mm headset	
3D Stereo Sound	
Memory: 30 MB internal memory, optional 8 GB microSDHC support
Microsoft Music Ecosystem Support (sync music with Windows Media Player)
Audio Playback:	Target 16 hours (Airplane Mode)
Crystal Talk technology for noise cancellation
Text to speech recognition

Technical specifications
Bands/Modes:	Quad Band
Dimensions:	115x53x10.6mm
Display:	2.0˝ QVGA 240x320 262K TFT
Form Factor:	Bar with internal antenna
GPRS Class 12:	EDGE class 12
Audio Playback Time:	up to approximately 16 hours
Size:	60cc
Standby Time:	up to approximately 300 hours
Talk Time:	up to approximately 360 minutes
Weight:	100g
Airplane Mode:	listen to music, take pictures, play games on the plane, with the RF off

EM326g

The EM326g was released in January 2009. It is the first ROKR phone to be available pre-configured for use with a prepaid network (Net10).

EM35

The EM35 was released in Q1 2009. It had a 3.15 MP camera, 110 MB internal memory, and a microSD card slot supporting up to 16 GB.

W6

The W6 was released in April 2009.

ZN50/ZN500

The ZN50 was released in July 2009 as a high-end phone in the Rokr series. It featured a 3.15 MP camera with auto-focus, improved screen resolution, a touchscreen and storage expandable up to 16 GB.

EM25/EM325

The EM25/EM325 was released in July 2009, at the same time as the ZN50 (see above).

EM28/EM330

The Motorola EM28/EM330 was released in July 2009, at the same time as the ZN50 and EM25/EM325 (see above).

Specifications

 1.3-megapixel camera
 Bluetooth
 Video Playback & Streaming Video
 Voice Recorder (60seconds limited)
 Calculator, Calendar, and Alarm Clock
 Vibrating, Games and Sync
 Volume Control
 Cellular Video
 SMS, MMS, EMS, and Chat
 Dual band GSM 850/1800/1900 MHz
 Weight: 90g (with battery)
 65K colour, 128fg
 MMS
 Video Recorder
 FM Radio: RDS Radio
 MP3 Player (AT&T Mobile Music / MusicID)
 SMS text messages
 MMS messaging with pictures
 EMS
 Photo and data sharing with Bluetooth 2.0
 Mini-USB port for connection with PC
 WAP 2.0 web browser
 Battery: Lithium-ion
 Talk time: Up to 7 hours
 Stand-by: Up to 23 days

References

Rokr
Mobile phones introduced in 2005
ITunes